Florian Fromlowitz (born 2 July 1986) is a German retired footballer who played as a goalkeeper. He is also a former German U-21 international.

Club career

Kaiserslautern
Fromlowitz advanced through the youth ranks of 1. FC Kaiserslautern, signing his first professional contract with the club in the summer of 2004. He made his Bundesliga debut on 25 February 2006 against 1. FSV Mainz 05, coming on as a substitute for the injured Jürgen Macho, and kept his place between the sticks for the remainder of the season, at the end of which the club were relegated. He was again replaced by Macho for the 2006–07 season, in which he did not make any appearances in the 2. Bundesliga. In August 2007, he was chosen by the club's new manager, Kjetil Rekdal, as Kaiserslautern's first-choice goalkeeper for the 2007–08 season, prompting Macho to leave the club during the month. However, he sustained an injury after 10 league matches and did not play again during the season.

Hannover
On 2 April 2008, Fromlowitz joined Bundesliga side Hannover 96 on a three-year contract with the beginning of the 2008–09 season, to play understudy to Robert Enke. He became the number one goalkeeper at the club following the unexpected death of Enke on 10 November 2009, but lost his place during the second half of the 2010–11 season to Ron-Robert Zieler.

Duisburg
In June 2011, he signed a contract with MSV Duisburg on a two-year deal, but left for Dynamo Dresden a year later.

Later years
After two years with Dynamo he signed for SV Wehen Wiesbaden.

In May 2017, Fromlowitz announced his decision to end his career.

Honours
 UEFA Under-21 Championship: 2009

References

External links
 
 

1986 births
Living people
Association football goalkeepers
German footballers
Bundesliga players
2. Bundesliga players
3. Liga players
Regionalliga players
1. FC Kaiserslautern II players
1. FC Kaiserslautern players
Hannover 96 players
MSV Duisburg players
Dynamo Dresden players
SV Wehen Wiesbaden players
Germany under-21 international footballers
Germany youth international footballers